

Locations 
Zhongli District, Taoyuan, Taiwan
Zhongli Township, Gangbei District, Guigang, Guangxi, China

People 
Zhongli Quan
Zhongli Mo

Other uses 
Zhongli (state), ancient state in China
"Growing Pears", a short story from Pu Songling's Strange Tales from a Chinese Studio
 Zhongli, a playable character in Genshin Impact